Peter Rawlinson is a British engineer based in California. He is the chief executive officer and chief technology officer of Lucid Motors and is known for his work as Vehicle Engineer of the Tesla Model S and the Lucid Air.

Early life and education 
Rawlinson grew up in South Wales and attended schooling in Cowbridge, a market town near Cardiff. He considered going to art school before deciding to become an engineer. Rawlinson attended Imperial College London, graduating from the Department of Mechanical Engineering in 1979.

Career 
Rawlinson has held several positions in the UK automotive industry, including Principal Engineer at Jaguar Cars, Chief Engineer at Lotus Cars and Head of Vehicle Engineering at Corus Automotive.

After joining Tesla in 2010, Rawlinson served as Vice President of Vehicle Engineering and Vehicle Engineer of the Tesla Model S. In this role, Rawlinson was responsible for the technical execution and delivery of the Model S, improving structure and production by taking advantage of the fewer restrictions facilitated by electric vehicle drivetrain in three years' time.

Peter joined Lucid Motors in 2013 as the Chief Technology Officer and was appointed Chief Executive Officer in 2019. He oversees the development of the Lucid Air along with Derek Jenkins.

References 

Year of birth missing (living people)
Living people
People educated at Cowbridge Grammar School
Alumni of Imperial College London
British automotive engineers
Welsh engineers
People from Cowbridge